Baker Lake is a lake in northern Washington state in the United States. The lake is situated in the Mount Baker-Snoqualmie National Forest and Baker River valley southwest of North Cascades National Park and is fed by the Baker River along with numerous smaller tributaries.

Water levels fluctuate an average of  annually. Formerly a smaller natural body of water, it was enlarged and raised  in 1959 in conjunction with the construction of the Upper Baker Dam, a concrete gravity hydroelectric dam capable of generating 91 megawatts. 

Baker Lake is a popular recreational area for fishing, camping, and boating and attracts local residents from adjacent Whatcom and Skagit counties. The Baker Lake area is also home to Swift Creek Campground which features 55 private campsites for tents or RVs, 2 group site as well as a boat ramp and marina. The campground can be found about halfway up on Mt. Baker Lake across from Park Creek. Formerly known as Baker Lake Resort and Tarr's Resort before that. It lies entirely within Mount Baker National Recreation Area.

See also

Lake Shannon
List of lakes of Washington
Skagit River

References

Reservoirs in Washington (state)
North Cascades of Washington (state)
Lakes of Skagit County, Washington
Mount Baker-Snoqualmie National Forest